Lucas Samaras (born 1936) is a Greek-American artist.

Early life and education
Samaras was born in Kastoria, Greece. He studied at Rutgers University on a scholarship, where he met Allan Kaprow and George Segal.

Career
Samaras participated in Kaprow's "Happenings," and posed for Segal's plaster sculptures.  Claes Oldenburg, in whose Happenings he also participated, later referred to Samaras as one of the "New Jersey school," which also included Kaprow, Segal, George Brecht, Robert Whitman, Robert Watts, Geoffrey Hendricks and Roy Lichtenstein. Samaras previously worked in painting, sculpture, and performance art, before beginning work in photography.
He subsequently constructed room environments that contained elements from his own personal history.  His "Auto-Interviews" were a series of text works that were "self-investigatory" interviews.  The primary subject of his photographic work is his own self-image, generally distorted and mutilated.  He has worked with multi-media collages, and by manipulating the wet dyes in Polaroid photographic film to create what he calls "Photo-Transformations".

Samaras represented Greece at the 53rd International Art Exhibition, The Venice Biennale (June 7- November 22, 2009) with the multi-installation "PARAXENA" in the Greek Pavilion in the Giardini.

Samaras has been the subject of several portraits by Chuck Close, in media including painting, daguerreotype, and tapestry.

Samaras' sculpture Stiff Box 12 has been outside the University of Michigan Museum of Art since 1997.

Art market
Samaras has been represented by Pace Gallery since 1965.

References

General references
Kristine Stiles and Peter Selz, editors.  Theories and Documents of Contemporary Art: A Sourcebook of Artists' Writings.  University of California Press, 1996.
 Jo Applin, '"Materialized Secrets": Samaras, Hesse and the Small Scale Box', Object, no. 4, 2002

Further reading

External links
Samaras at Pace Gallery
Getty Museum bio of Lucas Samaras

1936 births
Living people
Postmodern artists
20th-century American painters
American male painters
21st-century American painters
American photographers
People from Kastoria
Rutgers University alumni
Greek emigrants to the United States
Greek contemporary artists
20th-century American printmakers
20th-century American sculptors
20th-century American male artists
21st-century American sculptors